Jens Meierhenrich is a scholar of international relations at London School of Economics who directs the university's Centre for International Studies.

Works

References

Living people
International relations scholars
Academics of the London School of Economics
Year of birth missing (living people)